Johan Martin Schröder (born 13 May 1931 in Amsterdam) is a Dutch pilot and founder of Martinair, the second Dutch airline (after KLM) and the first Dutch air charter company. At the founding in 1958 the company was known as Martin's Air Charter (MAC). 

In 1998 (40 years after the founding of Martinair) Schröder retired as president and CEO. He was succeeded by Aart van Bochove.

Between September 1975 and September 1976 Schröder was chairman of AMREF Flying Doctors Nederland. In 1981 he became an honorary member of the organisation.
His son Marc Schröder founded the unmanned filling station chain Tango and Route Mobiel, a roadside assistance service.

External links
  Martin Schröder, lastige pionier met passie, BN De Stem, 24 May 2008

1931 births
Living people
Businesspeople from Amsterdam
Dutch aviators
Dutch corporate directors
Dutch chief executives in the airline industry
Dutch company founders
Dutch investors
Dutch nonprofit directors
Dutch nonprofit executives
Martinair